The Seat of Government Act 1904 was an Act of the Parliament of Australia which provided that the "seat of government of the Commonwealth" (i.e., the national capital) should be within  of Dalgety, New South Wales.

The site turned out to be unacceptable to the Government of New South Wales, due partly to its distance from Sydney and proximity to Victoria. The Act was repealed in 1908 by the Seat of Government Act 1908 which selected Canberra as the new site for the territory.

References
Seat of Government Act 1904 (Cth)
State Records of New South Wales A Guide to NSW State Archives relating to Federation

History of the Australian Capital Territory
1904 in Australian law
Repealed Acts of the Parliament of Australia